Maya Devi Temple may refer to:

 Maya Devi Temple, Haridwar, a Hindu temple in India
 Maya Devi Temple, Lumbini, a Buddhist temple in Nepal